Aye is the first compilation released featuring the works of Martyn Bennett, a Scottish-Canadian musician. It was released in 2012, seven years after Bennett's death and had tracks from four of his studio albums, as well as unreleased tracks.

Track listing
 Ud The Doudouk
 4 Notes
 Liberation
 Sky Blue Remix (Peter Gabriel)
 Swallowtail
 Harry's In Heaven
 Crackcorn - unreleased track
 Distortion Pipe
 Paisley Spin - unreleased track
 Blackbird
 Stream

iTunes bonus track
 Mackay's Memoirs

References

External links
Scotsman Interview with Kirsten, Martyn's Widow
Martyn Bennett website

Martyn Bennett albums
2012 compilation albums